The Kansas City Art Institute (KCAI) is a private art school in Kansas City, Missouri. The college was founded in 1885 and is an accredited by the National Association of Schools of Art and Design and Higher Learning Commission.  It has approximately 75 faculty members and 700 students. KCAI offers the Bachelor of Fine Arts degree.

History
The school started in 1885 when art enthusiasts formed the "Sketch Club" with the purpose of "talking over art matters in general and to judge pictures."  Meetings were originally in private homes and then moved to the Deardorf Building at 11th and Main in downtown Kansas City. The club had its first exhibition in 1887 and 12 benefactors stepped forward to form the Kansas City Art Association and School of Design.

In 1927 Howard Vanderslice purchased the August R. Meyer residence, a Germanic castle entitled Marburg and its  estate at 44th and Warwick Boulevard adjacent to the planned Nelson-Atkins Museum of Art. A Wight and Wight addition was added to the building. The residence was later renamed "Vanderslice Hall" and is listed on the National Register of Historic Places along with another building on the campus—Mineral Hall.

In 1935 painter Thomas Hart Benton left New York City to teach at the school.  Among the artists Benton influenced as a teacher at KCAI were Frederic James, Margot Peet, Jackson Lee Nesbitt, Roger Medearis, Glenn Gant, and Delmer J. Yoakum.  Though Benton brought attention to the Art Institute, he was dismissed in 1941 after making disparaging references to, as he claimed, the excessive influence of homosexuals in the art world.

In 1992 the Kemper Museum of Contemporary Art opened on the west side of the campus. On the occasion of its 130th anniversary in 2015, the Kansas City Art Institute received an anonymous donation of $25 million, one of the largest gifts ever to an American art school. The money will be used to bolster the school's general endowment, improve and renovate its campus adjacent to the Nelson-Atkins Museum of Art and, in the form of a challenge grant of $6 million, sharply increase the number of scholarships the school is able to give out.

Notable faculty
 Thomas Hart Benton – Leader of Regionalist art movement; KCAI professor, (1935–1941)
 Anne Boyer – Pulitzer Prize Winning Author and Poet
 Harold Bruder – Painter (1963–1965)
 Christiane Cegavske - Guggenheim Fellow in 2019
 John de Martelly – Regionalist Printmaker, (1934–1941)
 Jill Downen (‘89 Painting) - Guggenheim Fellow in 2010
 Dale Eldred – Sculptor, Environmentalist; Professor and Chair of Sculpture at KCAI (1959–1993)
 Cary Esser (‘78 Ceramics) – Ceramicist, and Professor and Chair of Ceramics at KCAI
 Ken Ferguson – Ceramicist, KCAI Professor Emeritus, (1964–1996)
 Glenn Gant – Regionalist painter, KCAI alumni and student of Benton, KCAI teacher, (1948–1960)
 Frederic James – Watercolor Painter, KCAI teacher, (1940–1950)
 Rob Roy Kelly - Graphic Designer and Printmaker, Chair of the Graphic Design Department (1964–1972)
 Cyan Meeks – Filmmaker and Video Artist
 Victor Papanek – UNESCO (United Nations Educational Scientific and Cultural Organization) Designer/Mediator; Author; Chair of Graphic Design Department (1976–1980)
 John Douglas Patrick – Painter, Draughtsman, KCAI teacher circa 1909–1936, member French Salon 1886–1889, Earned Bronze Medal 1889 Universal Exposition
 Stephen Sidelinger – Professor of Design (1972–1989)

Notable lecturers 

 Elaine de Kooning – Painter, Visiting Critic (Feb 12-March 7, 1965)

Notable alumni

 R. H. Barlow (Attended 1938)– author, anthropologist
 Eric Bransby (1942 Painting) – muralist, painter
 Mary Ann Bransby (1943) – painter, sculptor, jewelry maker, ceramicist 
 Paul Briggs (1996 Illustration) – animator and storyboard artist for Walt Disney Animation Studios
 Ellen Carey (1974 Printmaking) – photographer and professor
 Nick Cave ('82 Fiber) – performance artist 
 Dan Christensen (1964 Painting) – painter
 James Claussen (1975 Painting) – lithographer
 Richard Corben (1962 Design) – comic book creator
 John Steuart Curry (Attended 1914) – painter 
 Marc Davis – (attended 1927) animator, Imagineer at Disney
 Marisol Deluna (1989 Fiber) – fashion designer
 Walt Disney – animator, media entrepreneur, (attended Saturday classes as a child) received honorary degree from KCAI 
 Karon Doherty (1979 Ceramics) – ceramicist
 Angela Dufresne (1991 Painting) – painter
 Ellen Fullman (1979 Sculpture) – inventor of Long-String instrument
 Sherron Francis (1963 Painting) - painter
 April Greiman (1970 Graphic Design) – graphic designer, known for bringing the New Wave design style to America
 Amelia Ishmael (2004, Photography, Art History) – artist, art critic, curator, black metal specialist
 Jay Jackson (1975 Photo/Video) – animator for Walt Disney Animation Studios
 Paul Jenkins – painter (attended classes as a child)
 Christian Holstad (1994 Ceramics)  – conceptual artist
 Peregrine Honig (2019 Painting) – artist and entrepreneur
 Dennis Hopper – actor, attended Saturday classes during high school
 Suzanne Klotz (1964 Painting) – painter, sculptor
 Barry Kooser (1991 Illustration) – artist, painter, animation filmmaker, background artist for Walt Disney Animation Studios
 Arthur Kraft (attended 1952) – sculptor and painter
 Frank S. Land (attended c. 1909), former Imperial Potentate of the Shriners, founder of the Order of DeMolay
 Ronnie Landfield (1963 Painting) – abstract painter
 Doris Lee (1925 Painting) – Depression-era figurative painter
 Roberto Lugo (2012 Ceramics) – potter and educator
 Jim Mahfood (1997 Illustration)– comic book and graffiti artist
 Duard Marshall (1940 Painting) - Painter, lithographer, art restorer
 Christina McPhee (‘76 Painting) – new media artist
 Roger Medearis (attended 1938-1941) – Regionalist painter, student of Thomas Hart Benton
 Cyan Meeks (1995 New Media) – video artist and filmmaker
 Robert Morris (attended) – sculptor, performance and installation artist
 Jackson Lee Nesbitt (attended) – artist known for regionalist etchings and lithographs, student of Benton
 William F. Nolan (attended) – screenwriter, original Twilight Zone co-author
 Theo Parrish (1995 Photo/Video) – musician and DJ
 Margot Peet (attended) – painter, student of Thomas Hart Benton
 Chris Pitman (attended) - musician, Guns N’ Roses member
 Donna Polseno (1972 Ceramics) – ceramic artist
 Sam Prekop (attended) – photographer, musician with The Sea and Cake
 Archer Prewitt (1985 Painting) – illustrator, musician with The Sea and Cake and The Coctails
 Robert Rauschenberg (attended 1946 -1948) – painter
 Glen Rounds (attended) – author and illustrator
 Mikel Rouse (1979 Painting) – musician with Tirez Tirez, developed Totalism (music)
 Eric Sall (1999 Painting)  – painter
 Nelson Shanks (attended) – painter
 Marjorie Strider (1952 Painting) – painter
 Jim Suptic (attended 1996-1997) – sculptor, musician
 Akio Takamori (1976 Ceramics) – ceramic artist
 Robert Templeton (attended) – painter, painted the portrait of President Carter in the National Portrait Gallery
 Emily Weber ('09 Graphic Design) – Missouri State Representative (District 24)
 Christopher Willits (2000 Photo/New Media) – musician, sound and multimedia artist
 Kathryn Zaremba (2008 Interdisciplinary Art) - former Full House and Toothless star
 Arnie Zimmerman (1977 Ceramics) – ceramicist

References

External links

 Official website

 
Art schools in Missouri
Universities and colleges in Kansas City, Missouri
1885 establishments in Missouri
Educational institutions established in 1885
Private universities and colleges in Missouri